Ascuta is a genus of araneomorph spiders endemic to New Zealand in the family Orsolobidae, and was first described by Raymond Robert Forster in 1956.

Species
 it contains fourteen species, found only in New Zealand:
Ascuta australis Forster, 1956 – New Zealand
Ascuta cantuaria Forster & Platnick, 1985 – New Zealand
Ascuta inopinata Forster, 1956 – New Zealand
Ascuta insula Forster & Platnick, 1985 – New Zealand
Ascuta leith Forster & Platnick, 1985 – New Zealand
Ascuta media Forster, 1956 (type) – New Zealand
Ascuta monowai Forster & Platnick, 1985 – New Zealand
Ascuta montana Forster & Platnick, 1985 – New Zealand
Ascuta musca Forster & Platnick, 1985 – New Zealand
Ascuta ornata Forster, 1956 – New Zealand
Ascuta parornata Forster & Platnick, 1985 – New Zealand
Ascuta taupo Forster & Platnick, 1985 – New Zealand
Ascuta tongariro Forster & Platnick, 1985 – New Zealand
Ascuta univa Forster & Platnick, 1985 – New Zealand

See also
 List of Orsolobidae species

References

Araneomorphae genera
Orsolobidae
Spiders of New Zealand
Taxa named by Raymond Robert Forster
Endemic spiders of New Zealand